The Indiana Business Research Center (IBRC), established in 1925, is a research unit in the Kelley School of Business at Indiana University. The IBRC provides and interprets economic information for the state’s business, government and nonprofit organizations, as well as users of such information throughout the nation.

The IBRC maintains databases on topics such as income, employment, taxes, industry sectors, education, and demographics, as well as other economic indicators for the nation, the state and local areas. The Center conducts original research to generate information when existing data are not available or sufficient.

STATS Indiana 
STATS Indiana is the statistical data utility for the State of Indiana, developed and maintained since 1985 by the Indiana Business Research Center at Indiana University's Kelley School of Business. It is the Center's main data hub for economic, demographic and social data and is available to the public.

Recent initiatives 
 The Innovation 2.0 project provides insight into the innovation capacity and innovative output of a region, expanding on the prior Innovation Index.

Published studies 
The IBRC has published numerous studies.  The most recent list of studies is on the IBRC reports page.

Publications 
 InContext: A bi-monthly publication that provides articles about Indiana's workforce and economy for a general audience.
 Indiana Business Review: Published continuously since 1926, the IBR provides analysis  on economic and demographic issues.

Awards

InContext 
 AUBER 2009 Publication Award
 AUBER 2006 Publication Award
 AUBER 2003 Publication Award
 NASDA 2001 Publication Award
 LMI 2000 Publication Award

Indiana Business Review 
 AUBER 2009 Economic Outlook Publication Award

STATS Indiana 
 AUBER 2009 Award for Excellence

List of directors 
 Jerry Conover, 2003-current
 Morton Marcus, 1970–2003

See also 
 Indiana University
 Kelley School of Business

References

External links 
 Indiana Business Research Center
 STATS Indiana
 STATS America
 InContext
 Indiana Business Review

Indiana University
Educational institutions established in 1925
1925 establishments in Indiana